Giuseppe Miccoli (born 21 November 1961) is a former Italian male long-distance runner who competed at five editions of the IAAF World Cross Country Championships at senior level (from 1986 to 1991). He won two national championships at senior level (1987, 1988).

References

External links
 

1961 births
Living people
Italian male long-distance runners
Italian male cross country runners